One Eyed Man is the second studio album by Australian musician Mark Seymour. The album was released in March 2001 and peaked at number 67 on the ARIA Charts. Seymour said the album's title was inspired by an incident during a 1998 Hunters and Collectors tour when he was mugged in Sydney's Kings Cross nightclub precinct by a group led by a man with one eye. He said the album marked a break from the "Hunters hangover" evident on his solo debut, King Without a Clue.
 
At the ARIA Music Awards of 2001, the album won the award for ARIA Award for Best Adult Contemporary Album.

Reception
The album received positive reviews, with some noting similarities with the sound of Crowded House. A profile of Seymour in the Sydney Morning Herald also observed a Crowded House connection, claiming the album contained "the poppiest songs he's written", while Iain Sheddon in The Australian described One Eyed Man as a "polished, cleverly constructed album of strong pop songs that has cast him in the same light as his brother Nick's former band, Crowded House".

Track listing

Personnel
Mark Seymour – Vocals, rhythm guitar
Mazz – drums, percussion
Tony Floyd – drums
Diamond Jim Kempster – bass guitars
Rod Davies – keyboards, backing vocals
Daniel Denholm – Korg, Hammond organ, string arrangement
Cameron McKenzie – acoustic guitar
Helen Mountfort – string arrangement, cello
Hope Csutoros – violin
Jenny Thomas – violin
Tim Henwood – electric guitar
Bruce Haymes – Wurlitzer
Domenique Guiebois – violin
Rachel Whealy – cello
Michelle Rose – viola
Veronique Serret – violin
Chryss Plummer – backing vocal
Andrew Carswell – tin whistle
Nick Batterham – electric guitar
Jack Howard – trumpet
Barry Palmer – lead guitar
Tim Neil – Hammond organ

Charts

Release history

References

2001 albums
ARIA Award-winning albums
Mark Seymour albums
Mushroom Records albums